Hulda Berger (August 15, 1891 - August 24, 1951) was an American figure skater.  She won the ladies bronze medal at the 1931 U.S. Figure Skating Championships. Bulger died on August 24, 1951.

Results

References

1891 births
1951 deaths
American female single skaters
20th-century American women
20th-century American people